Allowissadula is a genus of flowering plants in the mallow family Malvaceae. They are known commonly as false Indianmallows. They are native to the United States and Mexico. 

Plants of the genus are subshrubs with hairy foliage and flowers each having a calyx six to fourteen millimeters in length, five styles and five carpels. The fruit is a schizocarp.

There are about 9 species. Species include:
Allowissadula chiangii
Allowissadula floribunda
Allowissadula glandulosa
Allowissadula holosericea - Chisos Mountain false Indianmallow
Allowissadula lozanii - Lozano's false Indianmallow
Allowissadula microcalyx
Allowissadula pringlei
Allowissadula rosei
Allowissadula sessei

References

External links

Malveae
Malvaceae genera
Taxa named by George Latimer Bates